Jeff Lynne's ELO Tour 2019 was a concert tour by British band Jeff Lynne's ELO. It is the group's second tour in North America since 1981, following their tour from the previous year. Dhani Harrison was the opening act for the tour.

Set list
A typical setlist for the tour:

"Standin' in the Rain"
"Evil Woman"
"All Over the World"
"Showdown"
"Do Ya"
"When I Was a Boy"
"Livin' Thing"
"Handle with Care"
"Rockaria!"
"Last Train to London"
"Xanadu"
"10538 Overture"
"Shine a Little Love"
"Wild West Hero"
"Sweet Talkin' Woman"
"Telephone Line"
"Don't Bring Me Down"
"Turn to Stone"
"Mr. Blue Sky"
Encore
"Roll Over Beethoven"

Personnel 

 Jeff Lynne – vocals, guitar
 Mike Stevens – musical director, guitar, backing vocals, harmonica
 Lee Pomeroy – bass, backing vocals
 Milton McDonald – guitar, backing vocals
 Marcus Byrne – piano, keyboards, vocoder
 Jo Webb – keyboards, guitar, backing vocals
 Steve Turner – keyboards
 Donavan Hepburn – drums
 Melanie Lewis-McDonald – backing vocals
 Iain Hornal – backing and co-lead vocals, guitar, fire extinguisher
 Jessie Murphy – violin
 Amy Langley – cello
 Jess Cox – cello
 Dhani Harrison – vocals, guitar (Handle With Care only)

Tour dates
Sources:

References

2019 concert tours
Jeff Lynne
Electric Light Orchestra